Pierre Lake is a lake in the U.S. state of Washington.

Pierre Lake was named after Peter Pierre, a pioneer settler.

See also
List of lakes in Washington

References

Lakes of Stevens County, Washington
Lakes of Washington (state)